Sjernarøy is a former municipality in Rogaland county, Norway. The island municipality existed from 1868 until its dissolution in 1965. The municipality was located in the Boknafjorden in the present-day municipality of Stavanger.  The administrative centre of the municipality was located on the island of Kyrkjøy, where the Sjernarøy Church is located.

The inhabited islands included Kyrkjøy, Bjergøy, Eriksholmen, Tjul, Nord-Hidle, Aubø, Helgøy, Nord-Talgje, and the western part of Ombo. The uninhabited islands included Hestholmen, Finnborg, Lundarøynå, Norheimsøynå, Norheimslamholmen, Staup, Fiskholmane, as well as many other smaller islands.

History
The municipality of Sjærnarø (the spelling was later changed to Sjernarøy) was established on 1 January 1868 when the old municipality of Nærstrand was divided into two: Hinderaa (located north of the Boknafjorden) and Sjærnarø (the islands located in the fjord). Initially, Sjernarøy had 922 inhabitants.

On 1 January 1965, the municipality ceased to exist due to major municipal mergers that took place throughout Norway as a result of the work by the Schei Committee.  The municipalities of Sjernarøy and Finnøy were merged with part of the island of Ombo from Jelsa municipality and the "Fisterøyene" islands from the municipality of Fister.  Together, these areas formed the new municipality known as Finnøy. Prior to its dissolution, Sjernarøy had 819 inhabitants. In 2020, Finnøy Municipality became a part of Stavanger Municipality.

Government
All municipalities in Norway, including Sjernarøy, are responsible for primary education (through 10th grade), outpatient health services, senior citizen services, unemployment and other social services, zoning, economic development, and municipal roads.  The municipality is governed by a municipal council of elected representatives, which in turn elects a mayor.

Municipal council
The municipal council  of Sjernarøy was made up of 15 representatives that were elected to four year terms.  The party breakdown of the final municipal council was as follows:

See also
List of former municipalities of Norway

References

Stavanger
Former municipalities of Norway
1868 establishments in Norway
1965 disestablishments in Norway